Aquila is a former municipality in the district of Blenio in the canton of Ticino in Switzerland.

On 25 January 2005, the cantonal authorities announced that Aquila would merge with Campo Blenio, Ghirone, Olivone and Torre to form a new municipality to be called Blenio. This union was carried through on 22 October 2006.

Historic population
The historical population is given in the following table:

References

External links

Former municipalities of Ticino